John Fitzgerald and Anders Järryd were the defending champions but lost in the first round to Jonathan Canter and Bruce Derlin.

Rick Leach and Jim Pugh defeated Pieter Aldrich and Danie Visser in the final, 7–6(7–5), 7–6(7–4), 7–6(7–5) to win the gentlemen's doubles title at the 1990 Wimbledon Championships.

Seeds

  Rick Leach /  Jim Pugh (champions)
  Pieter Aldrich /  Danie Visser (final)
  John Fitzgerald /  Anders Järryd (first round)
  Scott Davis /  David Pate (second round)
  Petr Korda /  Tomáš Šmíd (second round)
  Grant Connell /  Glenn Michibata (quarterfinals)
  Guy Forget /  Jakob Hlasek (third round)
  Ken Flach /  Robert Seguso (quarterfinals)
  Darren Cahill /  Mark Kratzmann (first round)
  Jim Grabb /  Patrick McEnroe (third round)
  Neil Broad /  Gary Muller (second round)
  Udo Riglewski /  Michael Stich (second round)
  Gustavo Luza /  Cássio Motta (second round)
  Jeremy Bates /  Kevin Curren (quarterfinals)
  Glenn Layendecker /  Richey Reneberg (first round)
  Patrick Galbraith /  David Macpherson (second round)

Qualifying

Draw

Finals

Top half

Section 1

Section 2

Bottom half

Section 3

Section 4

References

External links

1990 Wimbledon Championships – Men's draws and results at the International Tennis Federation

Men's Doubles
Wimbledon Championship by year – Men's doubles